Berry Castle may refer to the following places in England:

Berry Castle, Black Dog, an Iron Age earthwork near Black Dog, Devon
Berry Castle, Somerset
Berry Castle, Huntshaw, an Iron Age hill fort near Weare Giffard, Devon
Berry Pomeroy Castle , A Properly Haunted Castle, Devon

See also
Bury Castle (disambiguation)